Aeroplane (formerly Aeroplane Monthly) is a British magazine devoted to aviation, with a focus on aviation history and preservation. 


The Aeroplane 

The weekly The Aeroplane launched in June 1911 under founding editor C. G. Grey with Victor Sassoon. Grey remained editor until November 1939.

Aeroplane Monthly 
Issue 1 of Aeroplane Monthly was published in May 1973 at a cover price of 30p, in association with Flight International, by IPC Media. The founder was Richard T. Riding (1942-2019), whose father, E.J. Riding, had been photographer for The Aeroplane magazine of the 1940s. The magazine is now owned by Key Publishing Ltd and headquartered in Stamford, Lincolnshire.

The magazine is the successor to an earlier, weekly publication called The Aeroplane, founded in 1911.

See also
Flight International - contemporary of The Aeroplane

References

External links
 Official website

1973 establishments in the United Kingdom
Aviation magazines
History of aviation
History magazines published in the United Kingdom
Magazines established in 1973
Mass media in Lincolnshire
Monthly magazines published in the United Kingdom
Science and technology magazines published in the United Kingdom
Transport magazines published in the United Kingdom